Maceira is the name of several towns in Portugal:

 Maceira (Fornos de Algodres): parish in the municipality of Fornos de Algodres
 Maceira (Leiria): parish in the municipality of Leiria
 Maceira (Torres Vedras): former parish in the municipality of Torres Vedras
 Fornos de Maceira Dão: parish in the municipality of Mangualde
 Moimenta de Maceira Dão: parish in the municipality of Mangualde
 Maceira (Montelavar): a village in the parish of Montelavar